Lung Kong may refer to:
 Longgang District, Shenzhen, a district in Guangdong, People's Republic of China
 Patrick Lung, a Hong Kong film director